Overthrow is a DC Comics supervillain who serves as an adversary to the Blue Beetle.

Fictional character biography
Arnold Daniel Beck was an embittered employee let go from Kord Omniversal (the corporation run by Ted Kord, the Blue Beetle) who came to believe that he was just a victim of the machinations of the military–industrial complex, of which Kord's company was a prime element.  He acquired a power-suit of armor, and a stylized weapon resembling a cesta-punta used in the game of jai alai which hurled explosives, and set about to demolish Kord's main facilities; this naturally brought him into conflict with the Blue Beetle, who handily defeated him.

The Millennium Affair
During the Millennium affair, which saw a Guardian of the Universe and a Zamaron journey to Earth to help ten human beings become agents of evolutionary change, the intergalactic group known as the Manhunters threw all of its efforts into ending their program and neutralizing Earth's heroes from providing any assistance. Dozens of heroes found themselves confronted by loved ones, friends, employees, and allies who revealed themselves to be secret Manhunters who had reported back to their superiors over the years on their target's activities.  Unusually, no such act of betrayal had struck the Blue Beetle, and he began to vigorously seek out just who "his" Manhunter might be. He at first suspected that a corrupt Hub City police captain who had been blackmailing him with the knowledge of his secret identity was the Manhunter assigned to him, but this turned out to be merely a coincidental act; the Beetle was then confronted by Overthrow, who revealed himself to be the Manhunter assigned to report on him and neutralize him, if necessary. It had been the Manhunters who had provided Beck with his armor and helped him create the Overthrow identity, and on their orders he had attempted to contain and impede the Blue Beetle's activities. Beetle once again defeated Overthrow, however, and after the complete and utter defeat of Earth's Manhunters by the combined heroes of Earth (in which battle Overthrow also fought on the Manhunters' behalf) he disappeared.

Death
Overthrow was for some time living in the "supervillain" nation of Zandia, the former desmesne of Brother Blood's Church of Blood. Overthrow was part of Zandia's Olympic team, which was made up largely of supervillains.

During the events of the OMAC Project, Overthrow was in Moscow battling Rocket Red Dimitri Pushkin, the former JLI/JLE member (Pushkin's predecessor in the JLI #7, Vladimir Mikoyan, had been one of Beck's fellow Manhunters, who had revealed himself to the League and was destroyed in battle with them).  He was then targeted by the new head of Checkmate, Maxwell Lord. Lord dispatched an OMAC to attack Overthrow, and the cyborg swiftly cut the supervillain down, killing him in The OMAC Project #2 (July 2005).

Weapons
Overthrow's armored battlesuit's primary weapon was its cybernetic cesta, which allowed him to hurl explosive spheres with superhuman accuracy and velocity. The suit also gave Beck a degree of protection and allowed him to fly.

References

External links
 Unofficial Guide to DC Comics entry

Characters created by Ross Andru
Characters created by Len Wein
Comics characters introduced in 1987
DC Comics supervillains
DC Comics metahumans